Pleuroploca trapezium, common name : the trapezium horse conch or striped fox conch,  is a species of sea snail, a marine gastropod mollusk in the family Fasciolariidae, the spindle snails, the tulip snails and their allies.

This species is sought after for food but also to be used as a trumpet when the tip of the spire is cut off.

Subspecies and formae
 Subspecies Pleuroploca trapezium audouini (Jonas, 1846)
 Forma Pleuroploca trapezium f. intermedia (Kobelt, 1875)
 Forma Pleuroploca trapezium f. paeteli (Strebel, 1911)

Description
The golden brown shell is solid and heavy. Its shell size varies between 85 mm and 250 mm with a common length of 200 mm. The spire is of moderate length. The apex is usually eroded. The sutures are constricted. The shoulders on the whorls are covered with spiral rows of slightly pointed strong nodules. The surface is covered with fine, brown, incised spiral lines, mainly in pairs. The outer lip is dentate with seven pairs of teeth, situated where the paired lines meet the edge. The oval aperture is pale with strong ridges internally. The columella is smooth posteriorly. The siphonal canal is extended and short. The fasciole is weak.

Pleuroploca trapezium has been observed preying on the spiny cerith (Cerithium echinatum) in the Seychelles.

Distribution
This species is distributed in the Red Sea and in the Indian Ocean along Aldabra Atolls of Seychelles, Madagascar, Mauritius, Mozambique, Réunion (France), South Africa and Tanzania; in the Pacific Ocean from Japan down to Melanesia, New Caledonia (France) and North Queensland but rarely along Australian coasts.

Habitat
This species can be found in the benthic zone on seagrass beds at depths between 0 – 40 m.

References

Further reading 
 Dautzenberg, Ph. (1929). Mollusques testaces marins de Madagascar. Faune des Colonies Francaises, Tome III
 Richmond, M. (Ed.) (1997). A guide to the seashores of Eastern Africa and the Western Indian Ocean islands. Sida/Department for Research Cooperation, SAREC: Stockholm, Sweden. . 448 pp.

External links
 
 

Fasciolariidae
Gastropods described in 1758
Taxa named by Carl Linnaeus